Sofia Talvik (born 24 November 1978 in Gothenburg, Västra Götaland County) is a Swedish musician and singer-songwriter. Her music often blends elements of folk and pop; she also uses a lot of acoustic instruments in her songs, including violins, cellos, trombones, and acoustic guitar.

Career
Talvik released her debut album, Blue Moon, in 2005. It was recorded and produced entirely by Talvik herself, taking just 40 hours to record.

Her second album, Street of Dreams, was released in 2007, and features Bernard Butler, guitarist in former British band Suede on the track "It's Just Love", the first single to be released from the album. Talvik had been looking for a partner with whom to duet on the single, and contacted Butler via MySpace while working on the album.

Her third album, Jonestown, was released at the end of August 2008 and is the second album released on her own record label Makaki Music. The album and title track are named after the sanctuary built by the cult Peoples Temple (founded by pastor Jim Jones), where over 900 people committed suicide. Jonestown was produced by Swedish artist Tobias Fröberg who also produced Peter Morén from Peter Bjorn and John.

In August 2008, Talvik became the first Swedish female artist to play the Lollapalooza festival in Chicago, Illinois. Florida is Sofia Talvik's fourth album, which was released in May 2010, and was partially written during a time when Talvik lived in Orlando, Florida, though it was recorded back in Stockholm, Sweden.

In 2010, Talvik (along with Wille Crafoord and Mange Schmidt) performed an official song for the Swedish election, supporting the Prime Minister and the leading Swedish party Moderaterna. During 2011, Sofia Talvik released four EPs that formed the project L.O.V.E. Another project called H.A.T.E, (four rock bands covering each of the EPs) was also released alongside L.O.V.E. The participating bands were Ball of Mayhem, UK, and G.A.I.N, Badmouth and Akribi from Sweden. All the releases in the L.O.V.E project were fan funded

On 31 January 2012, Sofia Talvik released her fifth album, "The Owls Are Not What They Seem" –  a largely acoustic album featuring reworked versions of the new tracks from the L.O.V.E project. The title is taken from the TV show Twin Peaks by David Lynch.

Sofia Talvik embarked on her US tour "Drivin' & Dreaming" in December 2011. The tour went on for 1,5 years. In May 2012 Sofia did her 100th show on the tour at Pianos in New York City. Talvik released her first Daytrotter session on 21 September 2012 where she covered the song Wichita Lineman by Jimmy Webb and the song "So" an original by Talvik which was later released on her 2015 album Big Sky Country.

In October 2013, Talvik released a book called "Drivin' & Dreaming – One artist's odyssey through America" about her U.S tour. She also released a live album, "Drivin' & Dreaming LIVE" with recordings made on the tour. Talvik released Big Sky Country, her 6th full-length album with original songs partially inspired by long U.S tour, and a cover of Buffy Sainte-Marie's Starwalker, in April 2015. A Christmas album called "When Winter Comes" was released in 2017. The album is a collection of 14 self written Christmas songs that Sofia Talvik has been releasing for free to her fans in the end of the year since several years back. "Paws of a Bear" is a full length studio album that was released in 2019, it features a lot of beautiful pedal steel played by Tim Fleming

Discography

Albums
2005 – Blue Moon
2007 – Street of Dreams
2007 – Street of Dremix
2008 – Jonestown
2010 – Florida
2010 – Florida Acoustic
2012 – The Owls Are Not What They Seem
2013 – Drivin' & Dreaming LIVE
2015 – Big Sky Country
2016 – Acoustic (Florida, The Owls Are Not What They Seem, Big Sky Country)
2017 – When Winter Comes
2019 – Paws of a Bear
2020 - Paws of a Bear Unplugged

EPs
February 2011 – L
June 2011 – O
September 2011 – V
November 2011 – E
March 2014 – Folk

References

External links
 Sofia Talvik
 Sofia Talvik at Bandcamp
 Sofia Talvik at Last.fm
 Makaki Music
 Indiecater Volume IV
 Talvik's Artist Diary at HitQuarters, Jul 2008

1978 births
Living people
Swedish women singer-songwriters
Swedish singer-songwriters
21st-century Swedish singers
21st-century Swedish women singers